Group B of the 2008 Fed Cup Europe/Africa Zone Group II was one of two pools in the Europe/Africa Zone Group II of the 2008 Fed Cup. Three teams competed in a round robin competition, with the top team and the bottom two teams proceeding to their respective sections of the play-offs: the top teams played for advancement to Group I, while the bottom team faced potential relegation to Group III.

Estonia vs. Greece

Lithuania vs. Ireland

Estonia vs. Lithuania

Ireland vs. Greece

Estonia vs. Ireland

Lithuania vs. Greece

See also
Fed Cup structure

References

External links
 Fed Cup website

2008 Fed Cup Europe/Africa Zone